The 2017 Montana Grizzlies football team represented the University of Montana in the 2017 NCAA Division I FCS football season. The Grizzlies were led by third-year coach Bob Stitt and played their home games on campus at Washington–Grizzly Stadium in Missoula, Montana as a charter member of the Big Sky Conference. They finished the season 7–4, 5–3 in Big Sky play to finish in a tie for sixth place.

On November 20, it was announced that head coach Bob Stitt's contract would not be renewed. He finished at Montana with a three-year record of 21–14.

Previous season 
The Griz finished the 2016 season 6–5, 3–5 in Big Sky play to finish in eighth place.

Schedule

Game summaries

Valparaiso

@ Washington

Savannah State

Eastern Washington

@ Portland State

@ Idaho State

North Dakota

@ Weber State

Northern Arizona

Northern Colorado

@ Montana State

Ranking movements

References

Montana
Montana Grizzlies football seasons
Montana Grizzlies football